The House of Balšić, or the Balsha, was a noble family that ruled "Zeta and the coastlands" (southern Montenegro and northern Albania), from 1362 to 1421, during and after the fall of the Serbian Empire. Balša, the founder, was a petty nobleman who held only one village during the rule of Emperor Dušan the Mighty (r. 1331–1355), and only after the death of the emperor, his three sons gained power in Lower Zeta after acquiring the lands of gospodin Žarko (fl. 1336–1360) under unclear circumstances, and they then expanded into Upper Zeta by murdering voivode and čelnik Đuraš Ilijić (r. 1326–1362†). Nevertheless, they were acknowledged as oblastni gospodari of Zeta in edicts of Emperor Uroš the Weak (r. 1355–1371). After the death of Uroš (1371), the family feuded with the Mrnjavčevići, who controlled Macedonia. In 1421, Balša III, on his death, passed the rule of Zeta to his uncle, Despot Stefan the Tall.

Origin 

According to the testimony of the Balšićs themselves, they connect their origins with the Nemanjić dynasty. Balša II from Shkodër, in the charter to the citizens of Republic of Ragusa from January 27, 1385 said:

"... prayers and supplications of my holy ancestors Simeon Nemanja, the first myrrh-bearer of Serbia and Saint Sava ..."

There has been speculation on their origin, which some deem unknown. Apart from Mavro Orbini's tale, there are really no other accounts on their origin.  There exist fragmental assertions that they descended from "Emperor Nemanja".  There has been various opinions about the family's origin.

In modern scholarship, Lee, Lubin, Ndreca, Galaty, Mustafa and Schon consider the Balsha as local Albanian lords. According to Malcolm, the Balšići were probably of Albanian stock who had been but culturally Serbicized to a large degree. Ćirković concluded that they are of non-Slavic origin, being referred to in medieval Serbian documents as "Albanian (arbanas) lords". Hösch mentions the Balšići as native Albanian families that gained political power after 1355.  Murzaku says that the family had an Albanian origin. Madgearu mentions the Balšić as a noble Albanian family, however he states that their Albanian origin is unclear, due to the debate over the family's origin. Bartl views the origin of the Balšić family as Serbian, while Elsie mentions them as of "probably Slavic origin". Gelichi considers them Serbian-Montenegrin. Winnifrith states that they were Slavs who fought other Albanians.

In archaic accounts, Karl Hopf (1832–1873) considered "unquestionably part of the Serb tribe".  Ivan Stepanovich Yastrebov (1839–1894), Russian Consul in Shkodër and Prizren, when speaking of the Balšići, connected their name to the Roman town of Balletium (Baleč) located near modern Shkodër which delivers from Illyrian, related to the Albanian term ballë. According to Čedomilj Mijatović (1842–1934), the Balšić family had ultimate origin in the House of Baux from Provence (southeastern France); from that family sprung an Italian family (del Balzo), and from them the Balšići, and from them a Romanian family. Serbian historian Vladimir Ćorović (1885–1941) concluded, based on their name, that they had Roman (Vlach) origin.  Croatian ethnologist Milan Šufflay (1879–1931) mentioned them as of "Romanian and Vlach origin". Croatian linguist Petar Skok considered them to have been of Vlach origin, and Serbian historian Milena Gecić supported his theory. Giuseppe Gelcich theorized on the origin in his La Zedda e la dinastia dei Balšidi: studi storici documentati (1899). The theory asserting them as descendants of the Frankish nobleman Bertrand III of Baux, a companion of Charles d'Anjou is regarded as highly improbable.  German linguist Gustav Weigand (1860–1930) supported a mixed Albanian-Aromanian origin after he noted that the family name was included in a list of early Albanian surnames in Romania.

History 

The Balšić family was first mentioned in a charter of Emperor Stefan Uroš V, dated 29 September 1360. 
According to Mavro Orbini (writing in 1601), Balša, the eponymous founder, was a petty nobleman that held only one village in the area of Lake Skadar during the rule of Emperor Dušan the Mighty (r. 1331-1355). Only after the death of the emperor, Balša and his three sons gained power in Lower Zeta after acquiring the lands of gospodin Žarko (fl. 1336-1360) and by murdering voivode and čelnik Đuraš Ilijić (r. 1326-1362†), the holders of Lower and Upper Zeta, respectively. Balša dies the same year, and his sons, the Balšić brothers, continue in ruling the province spanning Podgorica, Budva, Bar and Shkodër.

The Balšići managed to elevate themselves from petty nobility to provincial lords.

Heads
 Balša I ( 1360–62)
 Đurađ I (1362–1378), [Lord of] Shkodër
 Balša II (1378–1385), [Lord of] Shkodër and Durrës
 Đurađ II (1385–1403), [Lord of] Shkodër, Budva, Podgorica, Durrës, Drisht and Lezhë, Autokrat of Zeta and the coastlands
 Balša III (1403–1421), [Lord of] Bar

Family tree

Simplified family tree:

Balša I ( 1360–62)
Stracimir
 Đurađ II Balšić
 Balša III
Đurađ I, married Olivera Mrnjavčević (1st) and Teodora Dejanović (2nd)
Jelisaveta or Jelisanta (d. 1443), Olivera's daughter
Gojslava or Goisava (d. 1398), married Radič Sanković, lord of Nevesinje, Popovo Polje and Konavli
Jevdokija, married Esau de' Buondelmonti, the ruler of Epirus (1385–1411)
 Giorgio de' Buondelmonti, ruler of Epirus 1411
Konstantin, married Helena Thopia
 Stefan Balšić "Maramonte" (fl. 1419–40), pretender to Zeta
Jelena or Elena
 Đurađ or Gjergj (illegitimate)
George
Ivan
 Gojko
Balša II
 Ruđina
Vojislava or Voisava, married Karl Thopia, the "Prince of Albania", with whom she had one son, Gjergj Thopia, Duke of Durazzo, and two daughters, Helena Thopia, Lady of Krujë, married Konstantin Balšić, and Vojislava

Annotations

References

Sources
Books
 
 
 
 
 
 

Journals

External links
 Rodoslovlje, Balšić

 
People of the Serbian Empire
Medieval Montenegro
League of Lezhë
Principality of Zeta